Church of All Saints is a Roman Catholic situated in the city of Tvrdošín.

History 
The church was constructed in 15th century, some sources claim the construction date around the end of 14th century . It was reconstructed in renaissance style in the 17th century.

On July 7, 2008, the church along with seven other monuments was declared UNESCO world heritage site under the name "Wooden Churches of the Slovak part of the Carpathian Mountain Area".

References 

Wooden churches
World Heritage Sites in Slovakia
Wooden buildings and structures in Slovakia
15th-century Roman Catholic church buildings in Slovakia